The 2016 Regional Women's Championship was a 50-over women's cricket competition that took place in the West Indies. It took place in July 2016, with 6 teams taking part and all matches taking place in Guyana. Trinidad and Tobago won the tournament, on better qualifying record after the final against Barbados was rained-off.

The tournament was followed by the 2016 Regional Women's Twenty20 Championship.

Competition format 
The six teams played in a round-robin, therefore playing five matches. Matches were played using a one day format with 50 overs per side. The top two teams in the group advanced to the final.

The group worked on a points system with positions being based on the total points. Points were awarded as follows:

Win: 4 points 
Tie: 2 points 
Loss: 0 points.
Abandoned/No Result: 2 points.
Bonus Points: 1 bonus point available per match.

Points table

Source: CricketArchive

Final

Statistics

Most runs

Source: CricketArchive

Most wickets

Source: CricketArchive

Notes

References

Women's Super50 Cup
2016 in West Indian cricket